John Catlin (October 13, 1803 – August 4, 1874) was an American lawyer, politician, public official, and officer within the railroad industry. Catlin served as acting governor of the Wisconsin Territory from June 23, 1848, until March 3, 1849.

Early life and career
Born in Orwell, Vermont, Catlin attended school at Shoreham, Vermont's Newton Academy, and taught school for nine years. Catlin was admitted to the Vermont bar and practiced law. In 1836, he moved to Mineral Point in Wisconsin Territory, where he helped set up a bank. He became the postmaster of Madison in 1837. He was president of the Milwaukee & Mississippi Railroad, which became part of the Milwaukee Road. Catlin served as a clerk of the Wisconsin Territorial Supreme Court and the Wisconsin Territorial House of Representatives. He was elected to the Wisconsin Territorial Council. He also was the first district attorney of Dane County 1839–1843. Catlin was a founder of the Wisconsin Historical Society. He was a member of the Democratic Party.

Catlin was appointed the Secretary of Wisconsin Territory by President James Polk, and served from February 24, 1846, to March 3, 1849.

Acting governor of the Territory of Wisconsin
Catlin was named acting Governor of the Wisconsin Territory following Henry Dodge's term as governor. Dodge ceased to be the governor of the Wisconsin Territory upon becoming a member of the United States Senate from Wisconsin.

When the state of Wisconsin was admitted to the United States on May 29, 1848, part of the Wisconsin Territory was not included. John Catlin was acting governor of this part of the Wisconsin territory until the Minnesota Territory was organized on March 3, 1849, which included that part of the Wisconsin Territory. As acting governor, Catlin went to the present-day city of Stillwater, Minnesota, where he issued a proclamation for a special election for the delegate from the Wisconsin Territory. Henry Hastings Sibley was elected the Congressional Delegate from the Wisconsin Territory, as a result of the special election.

Catlin was the last Governor of the Wisconsin Territory.

Personal life
John Catlin was the first Master of Madison Masonic Lodge Number 5, the first lodge to be formed in the city of Madison, Wisconsin. He became the Master of Lodge 5, January 10, 1845, and was Master for two years. Catlin's portrait hangs in the Mark Twain Room of the Madison Masonic Center at 301 Wisconsin Avenue in Madison. Catlin was Wisconsin's first lawyer, and postmaster. He married Clarissa Bristol on September 19, 1843, and they had one child, Lucia.

Death
Catlin died, on August 4, 1874, in Elizabeth, New Jersey, where he had retired to in 1863.

References

External links
"The Birth of Minnesota," William Lass, Minnesota Historical Society, Summer 1997

1803 births
1874 deaths
Politicians from Elizabeth, New Jersey
People from Stillwater, Minnesota
People from Mineral Point, Wisconsin
Politicians from Madison, Wisconsin
Businesspeople from Madison, Wisconsin
Vermont lawyers
District attorneys in Wisconsin
Members of the Wisconsin Territorial Legislature
Governors of Wisconsin Territory
Secretaries of State of Wisconsin
People from Orwell, Vermont
Wisconsin Democrats
19th-century American politicians
Wisconsin postmasters
Lawyers from Madison, Wisconsin
19th-century American businesspeople
19th-century American lawyers